Stephenson Percy Smith (11 June 1840 – 19 April 1922) was a New Zealand ethnologist and surveyor. He founded The Polynesian Society.

Legacy
The assessment of Smith's contribution, unreservedly generous at his death, has changed somewhat in recent decades. In 1966, The Encyclopaedia of New Zealand was generally positive, with some qualification. "His careful recording of traditional material, cross checked as far as possible by varying tribal histories, left an invaluable contribution... Although they can now be amplified or corrected on points of detail, the structure is substantially unchanged. In his studies on Maori origins he was more uncritical and framed hypotheses on what now seems slender linguistic and traditional evidence. The nevertheless high standard, for the period, of his own work and its publication provided a touchstone for later amplification which is being revised only today by more developed archaeological and critical techniques" (Bagnall 1966:266).

Smith's biography (first published in 1993) in the Dictionary of New Zealand Biography is more forthright, stating that "In some areas, particularly his account of the origins of the Maori and their arrival in New Zealand, Smith's interpretation has not survived the light cast on it by later historical and archaeological research. Scholars have criticised Smith's use of his source materials and his editing of Maori traditions for publication.... Smith's careers in surveying and ethnology were characterised by hard work and dedication, and he received recognition for both in his lifetime. Although it is now generally accepted that much of his work on the Maori is unreliable, his research nevertheless provided a basis for the development of professional ethnology in New Zealand. As a successful civil servant and respected scholar he was perhaps one of New Zealand's most prolific intellectuals of the late nineteenth century, and was a major contributor to the scientific debate over the origins and nature of the Maori" (G.M. Byrnes 2006).

Historian Rāwiri Taonui, writing in 2006 for the website Te Ara – the Encyclopedia of New Zealand, accuses Smith of falsification: "The Great Fleet theory was the result of a collaboration between the 19th-century ethnologist S. Percy Smith and the Māori scholar Hoani Te Whatahoro Jury. Smith obtained details about places in Rarotonga and Tahiti during a visit in 1897, while Jury provided information about Māori canoes in New Zealand. Smith then 'cut and pasted' his material, combining several oral traditions into new ones. Their joint work was published in two books, in which Jury and Smith falsely attributed much of their information to two 19th-century tohunga, Moihi Te Mātorohanga and Nēpia Pōhūhū" (Taonui 2006).

Notes

References
 teara.govt.nz, A. G. Bagnall, 'Smith, Stephenson Percy (1840–1922)' in A. H. McLintock (editor), Encyclopaedia of New Zealand, 3 Volumes. (Government Printer: Wellington), 1966, III:265–266.
 dnzb.govt.nz, G. M. Byrnes, 'Smith, Stephenson Percy 1840 – 1922'. Dictionary of New Zealand Biography, updated 7 April 2006. URL: *D.R. Simmons, The Great New Zealand Myth: a study of the discovery and origin traditions of the Maori (Reed: Wellington) 1976.
 M. P. K. Sorrensen, Maori Origins and Migrations. The genesis of some Pakeha myths (Auckland University Press: Auckland), 1979.
 teara.govt.nz/NewZealanders/MaoriNewZealanders/CanoeTraditions/en, R. Taonui. 'Canoe traditions', Te Ara – the Encyclopedia of New Zealand, updated 3 April 2006. URL:
 R. Walter, R. Moeka'a,  History and Traditions of Rarotonga by Te Ariki Tara 'Are, (Auckland: The Polynesian Society) 2000.

External links

1840 births
1922 deaths
People from Beccles
New Zealand surveyors
20th-century New Zealand historians
Atkinson–Hursthouse–Richmond family
History of Niue
20th-century New Zealand male writers
19th-century New Zealand historians
19th-century male writers
New Zealand ethnographers